Antonio Allegretti (1840–1918) was an Italian sculptor.
He was born in Cuneo in the Piedmont, and died in Carrara. He trained in Genoa under Santo Varni. His submission to a contest in Genoa of the statue of Cain, awarded him a stipend and a Gold medal from the Accademia Linguistica, and he moved to Florence. There he made a portrait of Marchese Ginno Capponi. From there he moved to Rome, where he became professor of sculpture at the Royal Institute of Fine Arts in Rome.

In Rome he completed a statue of Margherita del Fausto, exhibited at the International Exposition of Paris, where it was lauded, reproduced, and sold. His Eve after the Sin was purchased by Rome municipality, and is exhibited in the Galleria nazionale d'arte moderna.

References

1840 births
1918 deaths
People from Cuneo
20th-century Italian sculptors
20th-century Italian male artists
19th-century Italian sculptors
Italian male sculptors
19th-century Italian male artists